Karin is an ancient town in Bari region in Puntland, Somalia. It is famous for dates and fruit farms.

External links
https://halgan.net/2014/12/madaxweyne-gaas-oo-deegaanka-karin-ee-gobolka-barri-kaga-qeyb-galay-qado-sharaf-ay-ku-casumeen-dadka-deegaanka-masawiro/

Reference

Populated places in Bari, Somalia
 Bosaso